In Euclidean geometry, the radical axis of two non-concentric circles is the set of points whose power with respect to the circles are equal.  For this reason the radical axis is also called the power line or power bisector of the two circles. In detail:

For two circles  with centers  and radii  the powers of a point  with respect to the circles are

Point  belongs to the radical axis, if
 
If the circles have two points in common, the radical axis is the common secant line of the circles. 
If point  is outside the circles,  has equal tangential distance to both the circles.
In any case the radical axis is a line perpendicular to 

On notations
The notation radical axis was used by the French mathematician M. Chasles as axe radical. 
J.V. Poncelet used . 
J. Plücker introduced the term .
J. Steiner called the radical axis line of equal powers which led to power line.

Properties

Geometric shape and its position 
Let  be the position vectors of the points . Then the defining equation of the radical line can be written as:

From the right equation one gets
 The pointset of the radical axis is indeed a line and is perpendicular to the line through the circle centers.
( is a normal vector to the radical axis !)

Inserting the position vectors of the centers yields the distances of the centers to the radical axis:
,

If the circles are intersecting at two points, the radical line runs through the common points. If they only touch each other, the radical line is the common tangent line.

Special positions 

 The radical axis of two intersecting circles is their common secant line.
The radical axis of two touching circles is their common tangent.
The radical axis of two non intersecting circles is the common secant of two convenient equipower circles (see below).

Orthogonal circles 

 For a point  outside a circle  and the two tangent points  the equation  holds and  lie on the circle  with center  and radius . Circle  intersects  orthogonal. Hence:
If  is a point of the radical axis, then the four points  lie on circle , which intersects the given circles  orthogonally.
 The radical axis consists of all centers of circles, which intersect the given circles orthogonally.

System of orthogonal circles 
The method described in the previous section for the construction of a pencil of circles, which intersect two given circles orthogonally, can be extended to the construction of two orthogonally intersecting systems of circles:

Let  be two apart lying circles (as in the previous section),  their centers and radii and  their radical axis. Now, all circles will be determined with centers on line
, which have together with   line  as radical axis, too. If  is such a circle, whose center has distance   to the center  and  radius . From the result in the previous section one gets the equation
, where  are fixed.
With  the equation can be rewritten as:
.

If radius  is given, from this equation one finds the distance  to the (fixed) radical axis of the new center. In the diagram the color of the new circles is purple. Any green circle (see diagram) has its center on the radical axis and intersects the circles   orthogonally and hence all new circles (purple), too. Choosing the (red) radical axis as y-axis and line  as x-axis, the two pencils of circles have the equations:
purple: 
green: 
( is the center of a green circle.)

Properties:
a) Any two green circles intersect on the x-axis at the points , the poles of the orthogonal system of circles. That means, the x-axis is the radical line of the green circles.
b) The purple circles have no points in common. But, if one considers the real plane as part of the complex plane, then any two purple circles intersect on the y-axis (their common radical axis) at the points  .

Special cases:
a) In case of   the green circles are touching each other at the origin with the x-axis as common tangent and the purple circles have the y-axis as common tangent. Such a system of circles is called coaxal parabolic circles (see below). 
b) Shrinking  to its center , i. e. , the equations turn into a more simple form and one gets  .

Conclusion:
a) For any real  the pencil of circles

In case of  the circles  intersect at points .
In case of  they have no points in common.
b) For any real  the two pencils of circles

form a system of orthogonal circles. That means: any two circles  intersect orthogonally.
c) From the equations in b), one gets a coordinate free representation:

For the given points , their midpoint  and their line segment bisector  the two equations

For  one has to prescribe the axes  of the system, too. The system is parabolic:

Straightedge and compass construction:

A system of orthogonal circles is determined uniquely by its poles :
 The axes (radical axes) are the lines  and the Line segment bisector  of the poles.
They can be drawn easily.
In case of  the axes have to be chosen additionally. The system is parabolic and can be drawn easily.

Coaxal circles 

Definition and properties:

Let  be two circles and  their power functions. Then for any 
 
is the equation of a circle  (see below). Such a system of circles is called coaxal circles generated by the circles .

.

A simple calculation shows:

Allowing  to move to infinity, one recognizes, that  are members of the system of coaxal circles: .

(E): If  intersect at two points , any circle  contains , too, and line  is their common radical axis. Such a system is called elliptic.
The common tangent is their common radical axis. Such a system is called parabolic.
(H): If  have no point in common, then any pair of the system, too. The system is called hyperbolic.

In detail:

Introducing coordinates such that

,
then the y-axis is their radical axis (see above).

Calculating the power function  gives the normed circle equation:

Completing the square and the substitution
 (x-coordinate of the center) yields the centered form of the equation
.
In case of  the circles  have the two points

in common and the system of coaxal circles is elliptic.

In case of   the circles   have point  in common and the system is parabolic.

In case of  the circles  have no point in common and the system is hyperbolic.

Alternative equations:
1) In the defining equation of a coaxal system of circles there can be used multiples of the power functions, too. 
2) The equation of one of the circles can be replaced by the equation of the desired radical axis. The radical axis can be seen as a circle with an infinitely large radius. For example:

,
describes all circles, which have with the first circle the line   as radical axis.
3) In order to express the equal status of the two circles, the following form is often used:

But in this case the representation of a circle by the parameters  is not unique.

Applications:
a) Circle inversions and Möbius transformations preserve angles and generalized circles. Hence orthogonal systems of circles  play an essential role with investigations on these mappings.  
b) In electromagnetism coaxal circles appear as field lines.

Radical center of three circles, construction of the radical axis 

 For three circles , no two of which are concentric, there are three radical axes . If the circle centers do not lie on a line, the radical axes intersect in a common point , the radical center of the three circles.
Proof: the radical axis  contains all points which have equal tangential distance to the circles . Hence  is a point of the radical axis , too.
This property allows one to construct the radical axis of two non intersecting circles  with centers : Draw a third circle  with center not collinear to the given centers that intersects . The radical axes  can be drawn.

Additional construction method:

Let us call it an equipower circle. This property can be used for an additional construction method of the radical axis of two circles:

In detail: . If the power is large enough, the circles   have two points in common, which lie on the radical axis .

Relation to bipolar coordinates 
In general, any two disjoint, non-concentric circles can be aligned with the circles of a system of bipolar coordinates. In that case, the radical axis is simply the -axis of this system of coordinates. Every circle on the axis that passes through the two foci of the coordinate system intersects the two circles orthogonally. A maximal collection of circles, all having centers on a given line and all pairs having the same radical axis, is known as a pencil of coaxal circles.

Radical center in trilinear coordinates 

If the circles are represented in trilinear coordinates in the usual way, then their radical center is conveniently given as a certain determinant.  Specifically, let X = x : y : z denote a variable point in the plane of a triangle ABC with sidelengths a = |BC|, b = |CA|, c = |AB|, and represent the circles as follows:

(dx + ey + fz)(ax + by + cz) + g(ayz + bzx + cxy) = 0

(hx + iy + jz)(ax + by + cz) + k(ayz + bzx + cxy) = 0

(lx + my + nz)(ax + by + cz) + p(ayz + bzx + cxy) = 0

Then the radical center is the point

Radical plane and hyperplane

The radical plane of two nonconcentric spheres in three dimensions is defined similarly: it is the locus of points from which tangents to the two spheres have the same length.  The fact that this locus is a plane follows by rotation in the third dimension from the fact that the radical axis is a straight line. 

The same definition can be applied to hyperspheres in Euclidean space of any dimension, giving the radical hyperplane of two nonconcentric hyperspheres.

Notes

References

Further reading
 
 
 Clark Kimberling, "Triangle Centers and Central Triangles," Congressus Numerantium 129 (1998) i–xxv, 1–295.

External links

 
 
 Animation at Cut-the-knot

Circles
Elementary geometry
Analytic geometry